Olympia Looping, also known as Munich Looping, is a portable steel roller coaster owned and operated by R. Barth und Sohn Schaustellerbetriebe KG. The ride was designed by Anton Schwarzkopf and Werner Stengel, and built by BHS. It is the largest portable roller coaster in the world, and the only one with five inversions. It appears at many carnivals in Germany, most notably Oktoberfest, where it made its debut in 1989.

It is named for its five vertical loops, which resemble the Olympic rings. Although they are clothoid-shaped, their shape is closer to circular than the ones on most other roller coasters, so they exert unusually high g-forces on the passengers (up to 5.2 g). The entire structure weighs 900 tons and requires a space 85 m wide by 36 m deep. The ride usually runs with five cars per train, though at events such as Oktoberfest and Winter Wonderland in Hyde Park, London, it runs with seven to increase throughput in busy periods.

Name
The ride is almost always known as Olympia Looping in reference to its loops being painted to match those of the Olympic rings. However, there are two exceptions to this:

When being designed, the ride was known as Fünfer Looping (Five Loops), continuing a sequence of travelling Schwarzkopf rides that previously included Doppel Looping and Dreier Looping (Double Loop and Triple Loop). This name is occasionally used in trade literature.

Since 2016, the ride has appeared at London's Hyde Park Winter Wonderland event. In order to avoid reference to the Olympics (as the 2012 Summer Olympics was held in the city), and to fit in with the Bavarian theme of other sections of the event, the ride appears under the name Munich Looping although branding on the ride itself uses the German München Looping.

Incidents
On September 27, 2008, a driving motor failed on the ride, stranding over 20 Oktoberfest attendees at the top of the first hill. They were freed with the help of the Munich Fire Department.

On the 20th December, 2021, whilst the Olympia Looping was stationed in Winter Wonderland, a power cut caused the ride to come to a halt on the first hill, with riders having to exit the rollercoaster by walking down the trusses.

On the 29th March, 2022, while the Olympia Looping was stationed in the Vienna Prater (Austria), an employee was killed in a collision with one of the trains while accessing a restricted area.

Awards 

The ride was ranked in the Steel Roller Coasters Poll 11 Year Results Table awards from 1999 to 2010. Below is the table of the rankings of the traveling roller coaster.

References

Portable roller coasters